William Reais (born 4 May 1999) is a Swiss sprinter competing primarily in the 200 metres. He competed in the 200 metres at the 2020 Summer Olympics. He also holds the Swiss national indoor record for the same event.

Personal bests
Outdoor
100 metres – 10.35 (La Chaux-de-Fonds 2020)
200 metres – 20.24 (Basel 2020)
400 metres – 46.39 (Bellinzona 2020)
Indoor
60 metres – 6.66 (Magglingen 2021)
200 metres – 20.97 (Magglingen 2021) NR

References

1999 births
Living people
Swiss male sprinters
Athletes (track and field) at the 2020 Summer Olympics
Olympic athletes of Switzerland